The 2022 CECAFA Women's Championship is the 6th edition of the biennial association football tournament for women's national teams in the East Africa region organized by CECAFA. It  is hosted by Uganda between 1 and 11 June 2022. Being one of the nations currently serving a FIFA suspension as a result of issues between the local FA and central government, the Kenya Harambe Starlets will not have an opportunity to defend the title

Participants
The following 8 teams are set to contest in the tournament.

Did not enter 
:suspended by FIFA

Venue
Uganda will host the Championship at the FUFA Technical Centre in Njeru .

Draw
The draw will take place on May 11th at 10.00 am East Africa Time

Officials

Referees
 Suavis Iratunga 
 Tsehaynesh Abebe  
 Misgana Tilahun  
 Aline Umuton  
 Florentina Zabron Chief  
 Tatu Nuru Malogo  
 Elizabeth Gisma Louis
 Shamirah Nabadda 
 Assistant Referees
 Alida Iradukunda
 Arcella Uwizer
 Woinshet Kassaye
 Sandrine Murangwa
 Alice Umutesi
 Janet Balama
 Docus Atuhaire
 Nkumbi Nakitto

Squads

Group stage

Group A

Group B

Knockout stage

Semi-finals

Third place

Final

Goalscorers

Awards 
The following awards were given at the conclusion of the tournament.

Final standings

References

2022 in women's association football
CECAFA Women's Championship
CECAFE
2022 in African football
International association football competitions hosted by Uganda
CECAFA